Betong is a town in Betong Division in Sarawak, Malaysia, lying in the Saribas area. It was formerly under the Sri Aman district. Betong is located between three main rivers, Batang Lupar, Batang Saribas and Batang Kelaka, and covers an area of 4,180 km2.

In recognition of the area's rich history, rapid growth and contribution to Sarawak's economy, it was accorded Division status in 2002. It was then selected to become the administrative division centre. The areas of administration include the Saratok District and the Betong District. Betong has also been expanded to cover the Small District of Maludam.

Population
In 2020 census, the population in Betong was 162,537. The majority of residents are Iban (109,834); the next largest ethnic groups are Chinese (35,706), Malay (16,028), Bidayuh (182), Melanau (379), and Kelabit (408).

Economy and education
Betong's main economies are centered on farming, agriculture, and fishing. Most businesses are family-owned. 

Most bus express will pass through Betong junction, but only the Miri-Bintulu-Sibu-Sarikei-Betong-Lubok Antu bus route from Boreneo Bus will enter Betong bus station.

To ensure the development of human capital and to meet the demands of Sarawak Corridor of Renewable Energy, education in Betong has been the subject of significant investment over the years. Betong is acknowledged by many as where early Iban people were educated first.

There are a variety of schools in Betong, including five elementary/national (SK St John, SK Spaoh, SK Nanga Ajau, SK Balingan, SK St Augustine), one middle (SMK Datuk Patinggi Kedit), five secondary (SMK Spaoh, SMK Pusa, SMK Ulu Layar, SMK Beladin, SMK St Augustine), three vocational (Kolej Vokasional, SJK Chung Hua, Pusat GIATMARA), one boarding (Maktab Rendah Sains Mara), and one community (Kolej Komuniti Betong), one polytechnic (Polytechnic Metro).

Climate
Betong has a tropical rainforest climate (Af) with heavy to very heavy rainfall year-round.

Notable people
 Bonnie Bunyau Gustin (born 1999), national powerlifter who was born in Betong. 
 Henry Golding (born 1987), actor and model.

References

Betong District
Towns in Sarawak